Mustafa Ahmed (born 28 July 1996), better known by his stage names Mustafa the Poet and Mustafa, is a Sudanese-Canadian poet, singer, songwriter and filmmaker from Toronto. He released his debut studio album When Smoke Rises in May 2021.

Early life 
Mustafa Ahmed was born in Toronto, Ontario to Sudanese parents. When he was in grade 7, he performed an original piece, "A Single Rose", at Nelson Mandela Park Public School. The piece got a lot of attention, earning him high praises at Toronto's Hot Docs Canadian International Documentary Festival in 2009. During this time, Mustafa was known for writing poems about poverty in Africa, and poverty in the Regent Park area. He had a rough upbringing in his hometown, located in Toronto's oldest housing projects, Regent Park, where he attended Regent Park Duke of York Public School. Despite his young age, Mustafa was a witness of gun violence and street gangs.

Career

2014–2016: Poetry and Halal Gang 
Mustafa first gained recognition in 2014 at the age of 18, by featuring on Lorraine Segato's single "Rize Time", a remix of her band's own song "Rise Up", in which he performs a spoken word poem on the prelude. He then went on to produce the spoken word poetry film Spectrum of Hope in September 2014. It was a collaborative project between him and Thompson Egbo-Egbo. He was featured on CBC News in which he explores the connection between art and athletics in his Pan Am poem with Heather Hiscox. He gained national recognition for a poem which was shared by Drake on his Instagram in January 2015 in which he tagged Mustafa. With the death of Muhammad Ali, Mustafa wrote a poem to "honour his hero". Ahmed performed the poem that came from that writing on Metro Morning, a CBC Radio One local morning program in Toronto.

As member of Canadian hip hop collective Halal Gang, Mustafa has made appearances in a number of music videos for his associates, including the single "Feel" by Safe released in October 2016. In the same year, Mustafa was appointed to Justin Trudeau's Youth Advisory Council, advising the Prime Minister and the Government of Canada on policies and programs that are important to them.

2017–2019: Remember Me, Toronto and collaborations 
Poetry and film

Mustafa performed at the Fast in the 6 festival at Nathan Phillips Square held on 1 June 2018. In July 2018, he paid condolences to his deceased associate, Smoke Dawg, who had been gunned down on 30 June 2018, in front of a Toronto nightclub.

In March 2019, Pierpaolo Piccioli collaborated with four poets, including Mustafa, for Valentino's autumn/winter 19 collection to celebrate love whose words were emblazoned in bright lights at the show. A transcript by Mustafa from his poem "From the Perspective of Black Love" read "In your eyes I can see an eternity" as part of the collection. He describes attending the show as an emotional experience, seeing women in creations made for their bodies. Vogue described the event as "poetry back in fashion". The dress with his poem went on to be worn by Emilia Clarke.

Mustafa the Poet produced and released Remember Me, Toronto, a short Canadian documentary film about the hip hop culture in Canada. The film was released on 17 March 2019. The film was a project created for artists in this video and everyone in the Canadian hip hop communities. It discusses the losing of people due to the increasing gun violence and homicide rates in Toronto over the past decade. Mustafa aimed to discuss the systemic structure working against the lower economies of Toronto and wanted to give these artists the opportunity to "rewrite their memories and the memories of those they lost." In the film, the artists reflect on the inter generational nature of trauma and gun violence. Artists appearing in the short include Drake, Baka Not Nice, Gilla, Pilla B, TJin, Pressa, Loco City, Smiley, Top 5, Blockboi, Twitch, Jay Whiss, Puffy L'z, Rax, Booggz, Yung Lava, Mustafa the Poet himself and archival footage from the murdered artist Smoke Dawg. Noah "40" Shebib scored the movie.

Music and songwriting

In 2016, he connected with Toronto producer Frank Dukes with whom he helped co-write and background vocals on the song "Attention" by The Weeknd on the latter's album Starboy. Mustafa would continue to work with Dukes; the following year, he co-wrote two tracks on Camila Cabello's debut album Camila, which Dukes executive produced, "All These Years" and the single "She Loves Control". Mustafa was placed on Now'''s list of Toronto musicians to watch for in 2017.

In 2019, Mustafa co-wrote the Jonas Brothers single "Sucker" with Dukes, along with the band, Louis Bell, and Ryan Tedder. Mustafa was noted as one of the 10 Canadian songwriters who are penning the biggest hit songs right now by CBC Music in April 2019. He went on to title all the songs in Frank Dukes Parkscapes sample pack released in June 2019. The sample pack went on to be used on Taylor Swift's album Lover in which the Regent Park School will get royalties every time the album is brought, streamed or sampled. In 2020, he once again aided Frank Dukes in co-writing the Shawn Mendes and Justin Bieber single "Monster".

 2020–present: When Smoke Rises 
On 10 March 2020, Mustafa released his debut single "Stay Alive". The single was dedicated to those he's lost to gun violence and was known for capturing Regent's Park resiliency. The single was produced by Frank Dukes and James Blake. The single featured numerous cameos from Toronto rappers including Halal Gang members Puffy L'z and Mo-G as well as Lil Berete. It was known for including lyrics about resilience, community, and the bleak realities of living on the fringes pair perfectly. The single prompted Complex to list Mustafa on the list of Best New Artists of the March 2020.

Mustafa released his debut album When Smoke Rises on 28 May 2021. Described as 'inner city folk music,' the album was written and produced with Simon on the Moon and Frank Dukes, along with James Blake, Jaime xx, and Sampha, among others.

In 2021, numerous publications named Mustafa as an 'artist on the rise, including Complex, Pitchfork, i-D, and YouTube Music.

The album won the 2022 Juno Award for Alternative Album of the Year and was shortlisted for the 2021 Polaris Music Prize.

Mustafa was featured on Metro Boomin's 2022 album Heroes & Villains'', on the track "Walk Em Down (Don't Kill Civilians)", alongside rapper 21 Savage.

Discography

Albums

Singles

Other charted songs

Guest appearances

Songwriting credits

Filmography

Awards and nominations

Music

References

External links 
 

Canadian people of Sudanese descent
21st-century Canadian poets
Canadian songwriters
Canadian spoken word poets
Canadian documentary film producers
Canadian male poets
Black Canadian writers
Black Canadian musicians
Writers from Toronto
Musicians from Toronto
YouTube filmmakers
1996 births
Living people
Juno Award for Alternative Album of the Year winners